Karlheinz Steinmüller (born 4 November 1950 in Klingenthal) is a German physicist and science fiction author. Together with his wife Angela Steinmüller he has written science fiction short stories and novels that depict human development on a cosmic scale, grounded in an analysis of social structures and mechanisms. Angela and Karlheinz Steinmüller were not only among the most widely read authors in the GDR, ranking at the top of a 1989 poll of most popular science fiction authors in the GDR, but their works continue to be republished.

Awards
 1995: Kurd-Laßwitz-Preis "Best short story" for Leichter als Vakuum (with Angela Steinmüller and Erik Simon)
 2001:  German Fantasy Prize for die Verbreitung der phantastischen Literatur in zwei verschiedenen Gesellschaftssystemen sowie ihre Zukunftsperspektiven. (with Angela Steinmüller)
 2004: Kurd-Laßwitz-Preis "Beste Kurzgeschichte" for Vor der Zeitreise (with Angela Steinmüller)

Novels (with Angela Steinmüller)

 Andymon. Eine Weltraum-Utopie, 1982
 Pulaster. Roman eines Planeten, 1986
 Der Traummeister, 1990
 Spera, 2004

References

External links
Angela & Karlheinz Steinmüller's home page

1950 births
Living people
People from Klingenthal
East German writers
German science fiction writers
Writers from Saxony
German male writers